Pellenes bulawayoensis is a jumping spider species in the genus Pellenes that lives in Lesotho, South Africa and Zimbabwe. The male was first identified by Wanda Wesołowska in 2000 and the female in 2011.

References

Fauna of Lesotho
Spiders of South Africa
Arthropods of Zimbabwe
Salticidae
Spiders of Africa
Spiders described in 2000
Taxa named by Wanda Wesołowska